Walter Gates may refer to:
Walter F. Gates (died 1828), Canadian merchant and politician
Walter Gates (civil servant) (c. 1860–1936), British civil servant
Walter Gates (fencer) (1871–1939), South African Olympic fencer

See also
Gates (surname)